Diario is the third studio album by the Puerto Rican reggae band, Cultura Profética. Like previous albums, most of it was recorded at Tuff Gong studios in Kingston, Jamaica. Some of it was also recorded at Playbach Studios in San Juan, Puerto Rico. The album was released in 2002.

Track listing
 "Diario" (Gutierrez, Rodriguez) - 3:16
 "Inspiración" (Rodriguez, Silva) - 4:47
 "De Antes" (Rodriguez) - 5:04
 "Bieke" (Marley, Wailers) - 4:19
 "Gracias Vida" (Rodriguez) - 2:45
 "Dias Intensos" (Rodriguez) - 4:59
 "Quiero Hablar" (Bilbraut, Gonzalez, Rodriguez, Silva) - 3:44
 "Verso" (Gonzalez, Rodriguez) - 4:43
 "Pal Tanama" (Rodriguez, Silva) - 5:44
 "Boriken" (Rodriguez) - 4:15
 "Arboles" (Brown, Velez) - 4:25
 "Insomnio" (Rodriguez, Silva) - 5:02
 "Lo Que Somos" (Gutierrez, Rodriguez, Romero, Silva) - 5:06

Musicians

Boris Bilbraut – Percussion, Vocals, Producer, Funde Drum, Bateria, Coros
Eliborio Vera González – Guitar, Guitar (Electric), Producer, Funde Drum
Iván Gutiérrez – Synthesizer, Piano, Clavinet, Producer, Mixing, Wind Arrangements
Anamaría Hernandez – Altoflute
William Rodriguez – Percussion, Vocals, Producer, Bombo, Bajo Sexto, Mixing, Adaptation, Coros, Wind Arrangements
Omar Silva – Guitar, Guitar (Electric), Producer, Double Bass, Mixing, Wind Arrangements, Choir Arrangement
Luis Rafael Torres – Flute, Sax (Tenor), Wind Arrangements
Roy Sánchez Vahamonde – Percussion, Funde Drum, Akete
Arturo Vergés – Trombone, Wind Arrangements
Juan Quinones – Trumpet, Wind Arrangements

Guest musicians
David Betancourt – Violin
Félix Guadalupe – Cello
Omar Enrique Alfandel Velasquez – Violin
Yamil Otero – Viola
William Cepeda – Trombone, Caracoles
Bryant Huffman – Didjeridu
Inoel Jirau – Violin

Production
 Produced by Willy Rodríguez, Iván Gutiérrez, Omar Silva, Eliut González, Boris Bilbraut.

Recording
 Recorded at Tuff Gong Studios in Kingston, Jamaica, and Playbach Studios in San Juan, Puerto Rico.
 Mixing engineer - Errol Brown

2002 albums